Yan Hui (born September 23, 1995 in Baishan) is a Chinese female curler from Changchun.

Teams

Women's

Mixed doubles

References

External links
 
 Video: 

Living people
1995 births
People from Baishan
Chinese female curlers
Sportspeople from Changchun
21st-century Chinese women